Symbol is an unincorporated community located in Laurel County, Kentucky, United States. Its post office closed in 1988.

References

Unincorporated communities in Laurel County, Kentucky
Unincorporated communities in Kentucky